Sir Ernest MacMillan Senior Public School is a seventh- and eighth-grade school in the Scarborough area of Toronto. A triple-track school, it offers programs in Standard English (with Core French), Extended French, and French Immersion.

The school is named for Canada's only "Musical Knight".

Notable alumni
Arnold Chan, politician

References 

Educational institutions in Canada with year of establishment missing
Middle schools in Toronto
Education in Scarborough, Toronto
Schools in the TDSB